Shawn Z. Tarrant (born July 30, 1965) is an American politician who represented the 40th legislative district in the Maryland House of Delegates from 2007 to 2015. Tarrant was a member of the House Health and Government Operations Committee, Insurance Subcommittee and secretary to the Legislative Black Caucus of Maryland.

Background 

Tarrant graduated from Norfolk State University in 1989 with a Bachelor of Arts degree in finance/marketing. Tarrant has been employed for the past 17 years by Bristol-Myers Squibb Company. He currently serves as the director of state policy. In this role, he ensures patients with Medicaid as their insurance have access to the entire portfolio of life-saving medications sold by Bristol-Myers Squibb. In previous positions, he has helped municipalities and cities conduct HIV/AIDS testing and awareness programs.

Tarrant is a member of the NSU Prince Georges Alumni Association Chapter. In 1985, Tarrant was initiated into the Epsilon Zeta chapter (NSU) of Kappa Alpha Psi fraternity. He is a life member of NSU National Alumni Association and Kappa Alpha Psi.

Early career

Prior to running for office, he was the president of Ashburton Area Association from 1994 to 1999, a community improvement group in his neighbourhood. He created several long-standing programs and is most proud of the success achieved in re-zoning Ashburton to an R-1 zone status (i.e., allowing single-family-only dwellings). He is a frequent speaker on improving housing and zoning codes. Tarrant is also very committed to public school education, having served 6 terms as a PTO (Parent Teacher Organization) board member and vice president of the PTO at his children's public elementary school.

Maryland House of Delegates

Tarrant's first session in the Maryland House of Delegates was 2007. Tarrant served for 8 years in the Maryland General Assembly, passing over 30 bills during his tenure. He led the charge of the initiative to increase taxes by 70% on cheap, candy-flavored cigars targeting urban youth. He is most proud of his legislation that protects student privacy by banning University coaches, faculty and administrators from asking students for their private user names and passwords. This legislation has become the policy for University of Maryland Systems.

Tarrant in Baltimore

Tarrant was the president and vice president of his neighborhood association in the Ashburton community for 12 years. He was the vice president of Mt. Washington Elementary School PTO for 5 years. He is also a deacon at Union Baptist Church, on Druid Hill Avenue, in Baltimore.

Three open seats 
During the four-year term prior to Tarrant's candidacy for the House of Delegates, two of the delegates, Howard "Pete" Rawlings and Tony Fulton, died while in office. Marshall Goodwin and Catherine Pugh were appointed to finish their terms. Rawlings and Fulton were Democrats, as are Goodwin and Pugh. Prior to the 2006 Democratic primary, the only incumbent delegate in the district, Salima Marriott, decided to run for the Senate seat being vacated by the district's senator.  Catherine Pugh also decided to run for the same seat leaving the newly appointed Goodwin as the only incumbent in the race. The vacancies drew a large crowd of contenders;  including Tarrant, Barbara Robinson and Frank M. Conaway, Jr., who all finished ahead of Goodwin. The General Election in November, therefore, featured all newcomers for the three open seats.

General election results, 2006 
 2006 Race for Maryland House of Delegates – 40th District
Voters to choose three:
{| class="wikitable"
|-
!Name
!Votes
!Percent
!Outcome
|-
|- 
|Frank M. Conaway, Jr. Dem.
|16,432
|  32.4%
|   Won
|-
|-
|Barbara A. Robinson, Dem.
|16,032
|  31.6%
|   Won
|-
|-
|Shawn Z. Tarrant, Dem.
|13,921
|  27.5%
|   Won
|-
|-
|Jan E. Danforth, Green
|4,135
|  8.2%
|   Lost
|-
|Other Write-Ins 
|177
|  0.3%
|   
|-
|}
Tarrant was defeated in the 2014 Maryland Democratic primary after serving 8 years in the Maryland House.

Legislative notes 
Co-sponsored HB 860 (Baltimore City Public Schools Construction and Revitalization Act of 2013). Signed by the governor on May 16, 2013, the new law approved 1.1 billion dollars to construct new schools in Baltimore City.
 voted for the Clean Indoor Air Act of 2007 (HB359)
 voted in favor of prohibiting ground rents in 2007(SB106)
 voted in favor of increasing the sales tax  - Tax Reform Act of 2007(HB2)
 voted in favor of in-state tuition for illegal immigrants in 2007 (HB6)

References 

Democratic Party members of the Maryland House of Delegates
African-American state legislators in Maryland
People from Freeport, New York 
Politicians from Baltimore
1965 births
Living people
Norfolk State University alumni
21st-century American politicians
21st-century African-American politicians
20th-century African-American people